Ibrahime Mbaye (born 30 June 1997) is a Senegalese football player. He plays for Lavagnese.

Club career
He made his Serie C debut for Viterbese on 30 December 2017 in a game against Arzachena.

On 1 October 2018, he joined Serie D club Lavagnese.

References

External links
 

1997 births
People from Dakar Region
Living people
Senegalese footballers
F.C. Crotone players
U.S. Viterbese 1908 players
Serie C players
Serie D players
Senegalese expatriate footballers
Expatriate footballers in Italy
Senegalese expatriate sportspeople in Italy
Association football defenders
U.S.D. Lavagnese 1919 players